Hamjong Eo clan is a Korean clan. Their Bon-gwan is in Chungsan County, South Pyongan Province. , the clan has a membership of 15746. He was exiled to Gangwon Province to avoid conflict in the Song dynasty. After that, he settled in Ham Jong Gun, Pyongan Province, and founded Hamjong Eo clan.

See also 
 Korean clan names of foreign origin

References

External links 
 

 
Eo clans
Korean clan names of Chinese origin